Yoanis Linares Reyes (born 31 December 1975) is a Cuban retired footballer who played as a defender. She has been a member of the Cuba women's national team.

International career
Linares capped for Cuba at senior level during the 2012 CONCACAF Women's Olympic Qualifying Tournament (and its qualification).

References

1975 births
Living people
Cuban women's footballers
Cuba women's international footballers
Women's association football defenders